Cotoneaster horizontalis is a species of flowering plant in the genus Cotoneaster of the family Rosaceae.

Description
It is cultivated for its flat, symmetrical sprays of glossy green, deciduous leaves 6 to 12 mm long. The flowers appear in summer, and can range from pink to white. It is commonly grown in parks and gardens in temperate regions as hedging or groundcover.

Distribution
Cotoneaster horizontalis is native to mountains of Nepal, China, and Taiwan; in China it occurs from Tibet and Yunnan in the west to Jiangsu and Zhejiang in the east and is absent from the north and the very south. It has naturalised in parts of the United Kingdom, and may be becoming invasive. It has been recorded from Counties Down, Antrim and Dublin in Ireland.  

This plant has gained the Royal Horticultural Society's Award of Garden Merit.

References

External links
Information from NC State University

horizontalis
Flora of China
Flora of Nepal
Flora of Taiwan
Garden plants
Bird food plants
Plants described in 1877
Taxa named by Joseph Decaisne